USS Chilula (ATF-153) was a  constructed for the United States Navy during World War II. Her purpose was to aid ships, usually by towing, on the high seas or in combat or post-combat areas, plus "other duties as assigned."

Description

Chilula was laid down 13 June 1944, at Charleston Shipbuilding and Dry Dock Co. in Charleston and launched on 1 December 1944. She was commissioned 5 April 1945.

Decommission and Coast Guard service
After the war, Chilula sailed for home. At Orange, Texas on 8 February 1947, she was decommissioned and entered the Atlantic Reserve Fleet. She was transferred to the United States Coast Guard on 9 July 1956 as USCGC Chilula (WAT-153). Her hull number was subsequently changed to WATF-153 later in 1956 and then WMEC-153 in 1966. The Coast Guard decommissioned her on 19 June 1991 and returned her to the U.S. Navy who expended her as a target in 1997.

Citations

References

 
  

 

Cherokee-class fleet tugs
World War II auxiliary ships of the United States
Ships built in Charleston, South Carolina
1942 ships